The New Town Church is a main Lutheran parish church in Hanover, Germany. The Baroque church was built in 1666–70. It is one of the oldest Protestant Saalkirchen (aisleless churches) in Lower Saxony, conceived for the sermon as the main act of the Lutheran church service. Mathematician and philosopher Gottfried Wilhelm Leibniz and Field Marshal Carl August von Alten are buried here.

History 

After the destruction of the castle during the Lüneburg War of Succession, a new chapel was built before 1388 by Cord van Alten on the Rosmarinhof within the Hanover town walls, close to the present location of the church. It was dedicated to Mary. The church became Lutheran in 1533.

John Frederick, Duke of Brunswick-Lüneburg, converted to Catholicism in 1651. The church was designed in Baroque style, probably by the Venetian architect Girolamo Sartorio, the duke's , who didn't follow models but built a hall focused on the sermon. The architect was the duke's  Brand Westermann. The building was financed by the duke and the representatives of the Principality of Calenberg, and to a large extent by the early capitalist merchant and banker John Duve. Material from a former chapel of St. Gall in the old town was reused. The church was the burial site for members of the court.

Since the original tower was in danger of collapsing, a new tower was erected above the west portal from 1691 to 1700. The landmark has a square base, an octagonal upper floor and a copper-roofed cupola with lantern and apex.

The Neustädter Kirche was until 1936 the church of the General Superintendent. Johann Adolf Schlegel was superintendent from 1775 until his death in 1793.

In World War II, air raids heavily damaged the church; only the exterior walls remained. A reconstruction was carried out 1956–58 in simple form, led by Wilhelm Ziegeler.

A renovation of the interior 1992/94 was closer to the original concept and restored some of the surviving Baroque features. The Baroque interior was not restored completely, but preserved parts of the original furnishings; statues and images of Christ, angels, and saints, as well as allegorical figures, portraits, and monuments, were combined and rearranged with modern elements.

Architecture 

The  shows the characteristics of a rigorous early Baroque style, still based on antique models. It is one of the oldest Protestant  (Aisleless church) in Lower Saxony, conceived for the sermon as the main act of Lutheran church service. It is a long and spacious hall church, which closes to the east with a slightly narrower chancel. It has a large organ balcony to the west and small balconies along the south and north sides. The rich interior decoration was mostly lost in World War II.

Epitaphs 

Since 1902, epitaphs and tombstones which originally covered the floor of the church completely, were placed on the exterior walls, in memory of court officials, court ministers and superintendents with their families. The most important burial sites remained inside, including those of Gottfried Wilhelm Leibniz who was buried on 14 December 1716, and general Carl August von Alten (1840).

Organs 

On the west balcony, a main organ was installed in 1963 by Detlef Kleuker with three manuals and 38 stops. In 2010, the organ was beyond repair and was sold. A new main organ is planned. A temporary movable organ serves in the church.

A second organ, called  (Spanish organ), was installed on the north balcony 1998–2001 by Patrick Collon (Belgium). It reflects principles of Spanish Baroque organ building without copying a specific instrument. One model is the organ from the 17th century of the Iglesia Colegial in Lerma close to Burgos, other models are in churches in Covarrubias and in Liétor.

At present this organ is the only Spanish Baroque organ in Germany and is used for concerts and services.

Church music 

The church is known for its church music, performed in service and concert by the choir , founded in 1958.

When the church was restored after World War II, a service was held on the first Sunday of Advent, performing Bach's cantata BWV 61, conducted by  Werner Burckhardt. The church choir was named Kantorei on this occasion. Burckhardt was succeeded in 1968 by Christhard Vandré. Erhard Egidi was Kantor from 1972 to 1991. All cantors concentrated on music in church services, but also conducted concerts, with a preference of works by Johann Sebastian Bach. Egidi also performed works by his teacher Ernst Pepping and contemporary music. In 1986 he combined Stravinsky's Canticum sacrum and Ein deutsches Requiem by Brahms, in 1988 he conducted Stravinsky's Cantata and Mozart's Great Mass in C minor, in 1990 Bach's Mass in B minor,  and in 1991 Bach's St Matthew Passion,

Since 1991, the cantor has been Lothar Mohn. He kept his predecessors' tradition of an annual  (Lenten concert), frequently performing Bach's St Matthew Passion or St John Passion.

Literature 

 Wolfgang Puschmann: Neustädter Hof- und Stadtkirche St. Johannis, in: Hannovers Kirchen. 140 Kirchen in Stadt und Umland. Wolfgang Puschmann. Hermannsburg. 2005, ps. 12–15. .

References

External links 

  
Ev.-luth. Neustädter Hof- und Stadtkirche St. Johannis Calenberger Neustadt 
Neustädter Kirche Kirchenmusik in Hannover 

Hanover Neustadter
Neustadter
Hanover Neustadter
Tourist attractions in Hanover